Almonacid de la Sierra is a municipality located in the province of Zaragoza, Aragon, Spain. According to the 2004 census (INE), the municipality has a population of 894 inhabitants. It has a total area of 54 km squared.

This town is located near the Sierra de Algairén, Sistema Ibérico, in the comarca of Campo de Cariñena.

More detail on the Spanish Wikipedia page

References 

Municipalities in the Province of Zaragoza